The 2016–17 Towson Tigers women's basketball team represents Towson University during the 2016–17 NCAA Division I women's basketball season. The Tigers, led by fourth year head coach Niki Reid Geckeler, play their home games at SECU Arena and were members of the Colonial Athletic Association (CAA). They finished the season 12–18, 5–13 in CAA play to finish in a 3 way tie for eighth place. They lost in the first round of the CAA women's tournament to Hofstra.

Roster

Schedule

|-
!colspan=9 style="background:#000000; color:#FFD600;"| Non-conference regular season

|-
!colspan=9 style="background:#000000; color:#FFD600;"| CAA regular season

|-
!colspan=9 style="background:#000000; color:#FFD600;"| CAA Tournament

See also
2016–17 Towson Tigers men's basketball team

References

Towson Tigers women's basketball seasons
Towson